Shamsiddin Mohammed Shohin was a Tajik poet born around 1865-1866 in Bukhara, where he lived all his life. His father was a poor Mullah in Bukhara.

Family 
In 1887, Shohin married the daughter of Abdulqodir Parbonachi (Абдулқодири Парвоначӣ), who was the governor of Shuroobod at the time. His wife died 10 months after. His poem "Lily and Majnun" is in remembrance of his wife.

Toponyms 
The Shuroobod District, where his wife's father was governor, was renamed in his honour.

References 

1865 births
People from Bukhara
Tajik poets
Tajikistani male writers
Year of death missing